Shawnee Township is a township in Henry County, in the U.S. state of Missouri.

The township is named after the Shawnee tribe of Native Americans.

References

Townships in Missouri
Townships in Henry County, Missouri